Skenea serpuloides is a species of small sea snail, a marine gastropod mollusk in the family Skeneidae.

Description
The size of the shell attains 2 mm. The white shell is widely umbilicated and has a turbinate shape. The spire is elevated, with an obtuse apex. The three whorls are rounded and spirally striate. The body whorl descends obliquely, becoming free. The aperture is obliquely ovate. The periphery is contiguous.

Distribution
This species occurs in the North Sea and in the Mediterranean Sea.

References

 Montagu G. (1808) Supplement to Testacea Britannica with Additional Plates. Woolmer, Exeter, v + 183 pp., pls. 17–30

External links
 

serpuloides
Gastropods described in 1808